Portaferry Castle is a small tower house in Portaferry, County Down, Northern Ireland, overlooking the harbour. It was built in the 16th century by William Le Savage. Portaferry Castle tower house is a State Care Historic Monument in the townland of Ballyphilip, in Borough of Ards, at grid ref: J5930 5085.

History
The castle was probably built in the 16th century by a member of the Savage family. In 1635, Patrick Savage's brother-in-law, Sir James Montgomery of Rosemount (Greyabbey), repaired the castle by roofing and flooring it so that his sister could live in greater comfort there.

Features
It is a square building with a small projecting turret on the south corner. It is three storeys high plus attic and there is no vault. Most of the eastern corner is in ruins. The entrance at the base of the tower is protected by a small machicolation and the entrance to the ground floor chamber is protected by a murder-hole. A curved stairway within the tower rises to the first floor and a spiral stairway in the west corner continues to roof level.

See also 
Castles in Northern Ireland

References 

Castles in County Down
Ruined castles in Northern Ireland
Portaferry
Northern Ireland Environment Agency properties
Savage family
Tower houses in Northern Ireland